AM-679 (part of the AM cannabinoid series) is a drug that acts as a moderately potent agonist for the cannabinoid receptors, with a Ki of 13.5 nM at CB1 and 49.5 nM at CB2. AM-679 was one of the first 3-(2-iodobenzoyl)indole derivatives that was found to have significant cannabinoid receptor affinity, and while AM-679 itself has only modest affinity for these receptors, it was subsequently used as a base to develop several more specialised cannabinoid ligands that are now widely used in research, including the potent CB1 agonists AM-694 and AM-2233, and the selective CB2 agonist AM-1241. AM-679 was first identified as having been sold as a cannabinoid designer drug in Hungary in 2011, along with another novel compound 1-pentyl-3-(1-adamantoyl)indole.

See also 
 RCS-4

References 

Benzoylindoles
AM cannabinoids
Iodoarenes
Designer drugs